The Inkwell Award, sometimes shortened to the Inkwells, is a trophy given in the field of inking in American comic books.  The awards were partially named after the Yahoo group whose members include many in the inking community, and after the personal website name of organization founder Bob Almond. The awards concept was created in an "Inkblots" column by Almond in Sketch Magazine #35 in 2007, which saw print in 2008 after the group formation. The mission statement is "To promote and educate about the craft of comic book inking and to show recognition for ink artists."

History
In January 2008, Bob Almond began an online discussion on the Inkwell Yahoo Group about recognition for comic book inkers, where the topic of an award was broached. Almond invited participants from the group to form a core committee. The founding members were artists Tim Townsend, Jim Tournas and Bill Nichols, and writer Daniel Best. Artist Adam Hughes and DC Comics editor Mike Marts were recruited as ambassadors to lend support.

For year one, the committee selected several career-retrospective categories. The resulting ballot opened and ran for two months from April through May with the committee selecting nominations for the Hall of Fame award, the "Joe Sinnott,” named in honor of that veteran inker. Voting took place online and was open to the public. Following the inaugural results, Townsend departed in July and Nichols in August. The core group choose as successor artist representative Bob Shaw in November and artist-writer Dave Simons in December. An Inkwell Awards forum was created September 16, 2008.

The following year, with the partially revised ballot categories, a separate Nomination Committee was selected to choose nominees whose work had appeared in the previous year. The election took place for one month in June 2009. Following Simons' death, the core created the Dave Simons Inkwell Memorial Scholarship for students attending the Joe Kubert School of Cartoon and Graphic Art. Artist Nathan Massengill joined the core after the 2009 awards were announced.

Wizard Entertainment announced in February 2010 that it would support the Inkwell Awards through promotion and space at its shows and by sponsoring the awards' first live presentation, scheduled to take place at The New England Comic Con on October 1–3, 2010. Voting was rescheduled from June to August. This presentation did not take place, however. In 2011, Heroes Convention took up the position of host show for the annual live presentation ceremony. In 2018, the Inkwells announced the annual live presentation ceremonies would now be hosted in Oaks, Pennsylvania, at the Great Philadelphia Comic Con! starting with its 2019 ceremony. In 2020, there was no live ceremony. Originally there was to be a rescheduled ceremony at the Great Philadelphia Comic Con!, but this convention was later canceled due to COVID-19 concerns. There was no live ceremony in 2021 due to the ongoing COVID-19 pandemic.

Ms. Inkwell
In March 2010, the organization introduced its spokesperson character, Ms. Inkwell, conceived by Almond and designed by artist Randy Green with assistance from Massengill. The character debuted publicly at the Pittsburgh Comicon on April 23, 2010, as portrayed by Chrissy Cutler. Bob Almond envisioned Ms. India Wells as more than a "booth babe" but instead a respectable, family friendly member. Ms. Inkwell models draw attention to the Inkwell Awards, serving as the public face at many conventions and events. One of their most vital duties are fundraising efforts, including being liaisons between the Inkwell Awards and notable artists for donation support. The longest running Ms. Inkwell model is Hailey Skaza-Gagne, who not only has headed fundraising but has been invited personally as a guest since 2017. Hailey has done public speaking and also moderated panels at comic book conventions. She also is the first Ms. Inkwell to advance to senior contributor.

Staff 
Inker Michael Kellar was the first assistant director of the Inkwell Awards, overseeing auctions and fundraising. Mike Pascale (storyboardist, writer and artist), who became the second assistant director, is the copy & graphics assistant, handling public relations announcements, proofreading and fundraising. Erick "the Guru" Korpi oversaw the Dave Simons Inkwell Memorial Scholarship Fund. He was the Ms. Inkwell Model Liaison in 2011 and 2013. Erick resigned from the committee in 2015 but joined back up in 2017, the first member to ever serve two terms. In April 2021, Joe Prado joined the core committee, becoming the first to hold a dual role as a committee member and special ambassador. Rik Offenberger has been a member of the nominating committee from 2012 to present.

Some committee members do not currently serve full-time. They include Stacey Aragon (who served on the committee from November 2011 to June 2012, handling social networking, press release circulation, and fundraising); Sarah L. Covert (who was a technical consultant from November 2011 to August 2013), and Joe Goulart (who was the administrative assistant for conventions, Ms. Inkwell model liaison, and fundraiser from January 2013 to September 2014).

Funding
The Inkwell Awards are self-funded and rely entirely on donations.  A 2010 donation book produced by Jimmy Tournas debuted at the Boston Comic Con that April.

Award winners

MVP Award
 2008 Danny Miki

The Call of Duty Award
 2008 Bob Almond

Favorite Finisher / Embellisher
 2008 (retro)Tom Palmer/ (modern) Kevin Nowlan

Most-Prolific Inker
 2008 Danny Miki

Favorite Inker
Favorite ink artist over the pencil work of another artist from award year cover-dated, interior, American comic book material.
 2008 (retro) Terry Austin & Joe Sinnott (tie)/ (modern) Danny Miki
 2009 Wade Von Grawbadger
 2010 Mark Morales
 2011 Scott Hanna
 2012 Mark Farmer
 2013 Klaus Janson
 2014 Norm Rapmund
 2015 Victor Olazaba
 2016 Joe Prado
 2017 Scott Hanna
 2018 Scott Hanna
 2019 Walden Wong
 2020 Walden Wong
 2021 Ruy José
 2022 Eber Ferreira

Most-Adaptable Inker
Ink artist showing exceptional ink style versatility over other pencil artists in award year interior, cover-dated, American comic book material.
 2008 Danny Miki
 2009 Tim Townsend
 2010 Scott Hanna
 2011 Scott Hanna
 2012 Scott Hanna
 2013 Jonathan Glapion
 2014 Walden Wong
 2015 Walden Wong
 2016 Walden Wong
 2017 Walden Wong
 2018 Scott Hanna
 2019 Walden Wong
 2020 Walden Wong
 2021 Norm Rapmund
 2022 Norm Rapmund

Props Award
Ink artist deserving of more attention for their work over other pencilers from award year interior cover-dated American comic book material.
 2008 Danny Miki
 2009 Matt Ryan
 2010 Jonathan Glapion
 2011 Art Thibert
 2012 Scott Hanna
 2013 Eber Ferreira
 2014 Walden Wong
 2015 Wade Von Grawbadger
 2016 Wade Von Grawbadger
 2017 Scott Hanna
 2018 Joe Prado
 2019 Elisabetta D'Amico
 2020 Eber Ferreira
 2021 Eber Ferreira
 2022 Tim Townsend

The "SPAMI" Award (Small Press and Mainstream-Independent)
Favorite Small Press And Mainstream-Independent award year interior, cover-dated, American comic book ink work over another pencil artist (Non-Marvel or DC work).
 2009 Tim Townsend
 2010 Dan Parsons
 2011 Cliff Rathburn
 2012 Dexter Vines
 2013 Sal Buscema
 2014 Andrew Pepoy
 2015 Dan Parsons
 2016 Stefano Gaudiano
 2017 Jonathan Glapion
 2018 Sal Buscema
 2019 Stefano Gaudiano
 2020 Stefano Gaudiano
 2021 Adelso Corona
 2022 Adelso Corona

The All-in-One Award
Favorite artist known for inking their own pencil work in award year interior, cover-dated, American comic book material.
 2009 Mike Mignola
 2010 Amanda Conner
 2011 Francis Manapul
 2012 J.H. Williams
 2013 Skottie Young
 2014 Stan Sakai
 2015 Fiona Staples
 2016 Jason Fabok
 2017 Erik Larsen
 2018 Liam Sharp
 2019 Lee Weeks
 2020 Liam Sharp
 2021 Chris Samnee
 2022 Walter Simonson

Special Recognition Award (aka “Stacey Aragon Special Recognition Award” (SASRA))
At the June 2017 Inkwell Awards ceremony, founder Bob Almond announced the Special Recognition Award will be renamed the Stacey Aragon Special Recognition Award in honor of the long-standing Inkwells member "who passed after a decade-long battle with cancer" in 2017. This change took effect in 2018.
 2015 Bernie Wrightson
 2016 Vince Colletta
 2017 Allen Milgrom and Violet Barclay. The award for Violet Barclay was accepted posthumously by Allen Bellman. At the time of the awards, the Inkwell Awards was unable to find any of her heirs or family.
 2018 Russ Heath
 2019 Jack Davis and Marie Severin
 2020 Allen Bellman, Sal Buscema, and Norman Lee
 2021 Wendy Pini, Alfredo Alcala, and Frank Frazetta
 2022 George Pérez, Gene Day, John Severin, and Dave Stevens
 2023 Danny Bulanadi, Reed Crandall and Dave Simons

The Joe Sinnott Hall of Fame Award
A hall of fame designation for an inking career in American comic books of outstanding accomplishment (lifetime achievement, 25 years minimum; two winners chosen annually).
 2008 Joe Sinnott
 2009 Terry Austin & Dick Giordano
 2010 Klaus Janson & Al Williamson
 2011 Wally Wood & Kevin Nowlan
 2012 Mark McKenna & Scott Williams
 2013 Dick Ayers & Murphy Anderson
 2014 Joe Simon & Tom Palmer
 2015 Joe Kubert & Steve Ditko
 2016 Frank Giacoia & Josef Rubinstein
 2017 Jerry Ordway & Rudy Nebres
 2018 Joe Giella & Bob McLeod
 2019 Neal Adams & Dan Adkins
 2020 Bob Layton, John Romita Sr., & Bernie Wrightson
 2021 Mike Esposito, Pablo Marcos, Sal Buscema, and Mike Royer
 2022 Brett Breeding and Bob Wiacek
 2023 Frank Frazetta and Syd Shores

Above & Beyond Award
In celebration of the 10th anniversary in 2018, Almond created this award for organization members who have performed exceptionally or non-members who have made special efforts to further inking as an art form. 
 2018 Hailey Skaza-Gagne, the longest-running Ms. Inkwell, for her fundraising and event contributions; Robert Haines, for his 10 consecutive years on the Inkwell Nomination Committee; Mark Sinnott, for his work as Senior Inkwell Contributor for a decade, as liaison between the Inkwell Awards and his father, Joe Sinnott, and for his work in fundraising for the Inkwells.
 2019 Michael Hoskin, the second member to annually serve on the Inkwell Awards nomination committee; Shelton Drum, organizer/promoter of Heroes Con, the show to host the Inkwell Awards ceremonies from 2011 to 2018.
 2020—none
 2021 Bob Bretall and Johnny B. Gerardy, for ten years of Nomination Committee service.
 2022 Michele Witchipoo for ten years of Nomination Committee service.

Ambassadors
The position of ambassador recognizes creators for their support for the Inkwell Awards. Unless noted otherwise, all ambassadors continue to hold this position.

Special Ambassadors
 Joe Sinnott, 2008 until his death in June 2020. (Artist) The position of special ambassador was actually offered on June 23, 2012. Almond offered it retroactively in appreciation for Sinnott's support of the Awards.
 Mike McKone, July 2010. (Artist) 
 J. David Spurlock, March 2011. (Publisher, editor, author, artist, advocate)
 Clifford Meth, August 2014. (Writer, advocate)
 Aldrin "Buzz" Aw, January 2018 (artist) 
 Rags Morales, September 2018 (artist)
 Dan Parsons, September 2018 (artist)
 Mark Sinnott and Joe Prado, January 2021
 Dan DiDio, August 2022 (Writer, editor, publisher)

Ambassadors
These supporting artists who help advocate for inkers are called ambassadors.
 Adam Hughes, February 2008. (Artist)
 Mike Marts, February 2008 - August 2018 (Editor), inactive
 Sal Velluto, July 2010 (Artist)
 Mark Brooks, June 2010 (Artist)
 Trevor Von Eeden, July 2010 (Artist)
 Cully Hamner, June 2011 (Artist)
 Joe Kubert, September 2011 until his death in August 2012 (Artist, cartoonist, letterer, colorist, author, editor, legend)
 Eric Basaldua, September 2011 (Artist)
 Phil Jimenez, September 2011 (Artist)
 Jim Shooter, January 2012 (Writer, editor)
 Brian Pulido, October 2012 (Artist, writer, editor, publisher)
 Jim Starlin, August 2014 (Artist, writer)
 Laura Martin, August 2014 (Colorist)
 Rich Buckler, 2015 until his death in May 2017 (Artist)

Guests of honor and keynote speakers
At many of the live ceremonies, notable comic book creators were invited as guests of honor and keynote speakers. In 2020 and 2021, there were no live ceremonies due to the COVID-19 pandemic.
 2011: Dan Panosian, Keynote Speaker
 2012: Bob McLeod, Keynote Speaker
 2013: Jimmy Palmiotti, Keynote Speaker
 2014: Bill Sienkiewicz, Guest of Honor
 2015: Klaus Janson, Guest of Honor
 2016: Jim Steranko, Special Appearance
 2017: Joe Giella, Guest of Honor and Allen Bellman, Guest Speaker
 2018: Mike Royer, Guest of Honor
 2019: Mark McKenna, Guest of Honor

Contributors
Volunteer contributors include artist Dan Panosian, who designed the Inkwell Awards logo. In January 2010, artist Randy Green was added as visual designer of the Ms. Inkwell charity spokesperson character, personified by model Chrissy Cutler.

References

External links
 Comic Art Fans Gallery
 Inkwell Awards on Facebook
 Inkwell Awards Twitter

Comics awards